Catherine Impey (1847 – 14 December 1923) was a British Quaker activist against racial discrimination. She founded Britain's first anti-racist journal, Anti-Caste, in March 1888 and edited it until its last edition in 1895.

The journal was inspired by Booker T. Washington's Southern Letter. Impey visited the United States several times from 1878 and the journal focused largely on issues in America. In 1893, she formed an organisation, The Society for the Recognition of the Universal Brotherhood of Man, with the American Ida B. Wells, who visited the UK to campaign against lynching. Impey became a vegetarian in 1879.

Impey lived in Street, Somerset.

See also
 Alfred Webb

Further reading
 Dr Caroline Bressey, Anti-Caste: Britain’s First Anti-racist Journal, synopsis on ESRC website (RES-000-22-0522), accessed 27 July 2006. Also abstract from Dr Caroline Bressey in teaching programme at University of Essex, "Departmental Seminars - Abstracts and Bio-notes", accessed 27 July 2006.

Notes

1847 births
1923 deaths
English Quakers
People from Street, Somerset